Zel Keh, also rendered as Zilakeh, may refer to:
 Zel Keh-ye Olya
 Zel Keh-ye Sofla